The Roman Catholic Archdiocese of Bahía Blanca (Archidioecesis Sinus Albi) is a Latin Metropolitan archdiocese of the Roman Catholic Church with an ecclesiastical province in the eastern region of the national capital's province of Buenos Aires, central Argentina.
 
Its cathedral archiepiscopal see and mother church, located in the city of Bahía Blanca, is the Cathedral of Our Lady of Mercy. Since 12 July 2017  Carlos Azpiroz Costa has been its Archbishop.

Extent and statistics 
As per 2015, the Archdiocese pastorally served 661,096 Catholics (83.3% of 793,517 total) on 82,624 km² in 55 parishes and 236 missions with 71 priests (45 diocesan, 26 religious), 27 deacons, 211 lay religious (44 brothers, 167 sisters) and 15 seminarians.
 
It covers the partidos (municipalities) of Adolfo Alsina, Adolfo González Chávez, Bahía Blanca, Coronel Dorrego, Coronel de Marina Leonardo Rosales, Coronel Pringles, Coronel Suárez, Daireaux, Guaminí, Monte Hermoso, Patagones, Puán, Saavedra, San Cayetano, Tornquist, Tres Arroyos and Villarino.

Ecclesiastical province of Bahía Blanca 
The Metropolitan Archdiocese has suffragan sees encompassing all of the administrative Provinces of Patagonia and Tierra del Fuego, notably :
 Roman Catholic Diocese of Alto Valle del Río Negro
 Roman Catholic Diocese of Comodoro Rivadavia
 Roman Catholic Diocese of Río Gallegos
 Roman Catholic Diocese of San Carlos de Bariloche
 Roman Catholic Diocese of Santa Rosa, Argentina, its daughter
 Roman Catholic Diocese of Viedma 
 (pre-diocesan) Territorial Prelature of Esquel.

History 
 It was erected as Diocese of Bahía Blanca / Sinus Albi (Latin) on 20 April 1934 by Pope Pius XI's bull Nobilis Argentinae nationis, on territory split off from the Archdiocese of La Plata. Its first bishop was Leandro Bautista Astelarra (1934–1943).
 It enjoyed a Papal visit from Pope John Paul II in April 1987.

Bishops
(all Roman Rite)

Episcopal Ordinaries

Suffragan Bishops of Bahía Blanca 
 Leandro Bautista Astelarra (13 September 1934 – death 24 August 1943) 
 Germiniano Esorto (2 November 1946 – 31 May 1972 see below), previously Titular Bishop of Birtha (1943.08.23 – 1946.11.02) as Auxiliary Bishop of La Plata (Argentina) (1943.08.23 – 1946.11.02)

Metropolitan Archbishops of Bahía Blanca 
 Germiniano Esorto (see above 2 November 1946 – retired 31 May 1972) 
 Jorge Mayer (31 May 1972 – retired 31 May 1991) died 2010: previously Bishop of Santa Rosa (Argentina) (1957.03.13 – 1972.05.31)
 Auxiliary Bishop: Emilio Ogñénovich (1979.10.01 – 1982.06.08), Titular Bishop of Mibiarca (1979.10.01 – 1982.06.08), later 'last' Suffragan Bishop of Mercedes (Argentina) (1982.06.08 – 1989.05.10), (see) restyled Bishop of Mercedes–Luján (1989.05.10 – 1997.11.21), (see) promoted first Archbishop of Mercedes–Luján (1997.11.21 – retired 2000.03.07), died 2012
 Auxiliary Bishop: José Vittorio Tommasí (1984.11.19 – 1991.08.28), Titular Bishop of Equizetum (1984.11.19 – 1991.08.28); later Bishop of Nueve de Julio (Argentina) (1991.08.28 – death 1998.09.16)
 Rómulo García (31 May 1991 – retired 15 June 2002), died 2005; previously Titular Bishop of Uzita (1975.08.09 – 1976.01.19) as Auxiliary Bishop of Diocese of Mar del Plata (Argentina) (1975.08.09 – 1976.01.19), succeeding as Bishop of Mar del Plata (1976.01.19 – 1991.05.31) 
 Auxiliary Bishop: Néstor Hugo Navarro (1998.04.15 – 2003.03.19), Titular Bishop of Rotdon (1998.04.15 – 2003.03.19); next Bishop of Alto Valle del Río Negro (Argentina) (2003.03.19 – retired 2010.02.10)
 Guillermo José Garlatti (11 March 2003 – retired 12 July 2017); previously Titular Bishop of Aquæ regiæ (1994.08.27 – 1997.02.20) as Auxiliary Bishop of Archdiocese of La Plata (Argentina) (1994.08.27 – 1997.02.20), Bishop of San Rafael (Argentina) (1997.02.20 – 2003.03.11)
 Auxiliary Bishop: Pedro María Laxague (2006.11.14 – 2015.11.03), Titular Bishop of Castra Severiana (2006.11.14 – 2015.11.03); next Bishop of Zárate–Campana (Argentina) (2015.11.03 – ...)
 Carlos Alfonso Azpiroz Costa, Dominican Order (O.P.) (12 July 2017 – ...), previously Master (General Superior) of the Order of Preachers (O.P., Dominicans) (2001.07.14 – 2010.09.05), Grand Chancellor of Pontifical University of St. Thomas Aquinas (Angelicum) (2001.07.14 – 2010.09.05), Coadjutor Archbishop of Bahía Blanca (2015.11.03 – succession 2017.07.12).

Coadjutor archbishop
Carlos Alfonso Azpiroz Costa, O.P. (2015-2017)

Auxiliary bishops
Emilio Ogñénovich (1979-1982), appointed Bishop of Mercedes
José Vittorio Tommasí (1984-1991), appointed Bishop of Nueve de Julio
Néstor Hugo Navarro (1998-2003), appointed Bishop of Alto Valle del Río Negro
Pedro María Laxague (2006-2015) appointed Bishop of Zárate-Campana
Jorge Luis Wagner (2019-)

See also 
 Roman Catholicism in Argentina

Sources and external links 
 GCathholic with Google map - data for all sections
  Archdiocese of Bahía Blanca  at AICA (Argentine Catholic News Agency).
 

Roman Catholic dioceses in Argentina
Roman Catholic Ecclesiastical Province of Bahía Blanca
Religious organizations established in 1934
Bahía Blanca
Roman Catholic dioceses and prelatures established in the 20th century